Claude Russell-Brown (11 April 1873 – 19 January 1939) was a Canadian tennis player. He reached the quarterfinals of the men's singles event at the 1908 Summer Olympics and competed at Wimbledon in 1904.

References

External links
 

1873 births
1939 deaths
Canadian male tennis players
Olympic tennis players of Canada
Tennis players at the 1908 Summer Olympics
Place of birth missing
19th-century Canadian people
20th-century Canadian people